Roger Lee Craig (born February 17, 1930) is an American former pitcher, coach and manager in Major League Baseball (MLB). Craig played for five National League teams over all or parts of 12 seasons (1955–1966)—most notably as a member of the Brooklyn / Los Angeles Dodgers and New York Mets—and then forged a successful post-playing career as a pitching coach and manager. As a player and coach, Craig was part of four World Series championship teams. As a manager, he led the 1989 San Francisco Giants to the team's first National League championship in 27 years. He was born in Durham, North Carolina, and attended North Carolina State University.

Playing career
Craig attended Durham High School in Durham, North Carolina where he played multiple sports. He began his college sports career on a basketball scholarship at NC State University but lasted only a year at NC State before signing a contract with the Brooklyn Dodgers in 1950 for $6,000.

He signed with Brooklyn in 1950 and began his rise through the Dodger farm system, missing 1952 and 1953 while performing Korean War military service. In July 1955, after he won ten of 12 decisions for the Triple-A Montreal Royals, Craig was called up to the majors. In his debut game July 17, Craig was the Dodgers' starting pitcher against the Cincinnati Redlegs at Ebbets Field. He threw a complete game victory and allowed only three hits and one earned run as Brooklyn triumphed, 6–2. He made nine more starts for the Dodgers over the next ten weeks, and relieved in a dozen games more; he threw two more complete games, earned two saves, and posted a fine 2.78 earned run average as the Dodgers won the National League pennant. He started Game 5 of the 1955 World Series against the New York Yankees, worked six innings, gave up four hits and only two runs before being relieved by Clem Labine, and was credited with Brooklyn's 5–3 victory. Two days later, on October 4, 1955, Craig's teammate Johnny Podres shut out the Yanks in Game 7, giving Brooklyn its first and only World Series championship.

Craig would appear in three more World Series. He was treated harshly by the Yankees and Chicago White Sox in the 1956 and 1959 World Series, losing two decisions with a dismal 9.98 earned run average; but he was almost flawless as a reliever for the St. Louis Cardinals in the 1964 Series. In two appearances for the Redbirds, he kept the Yankees scoreless and allowed only two hits in five innings pitched. A yeoman effort in Game 4, in which Craig worked 4 scoreless innings pitched (with eight strikeouts) in relief of Ray Sadecki, enabled the Cardinals to recover from a 3–0 deficit to win, 4–3, with Craig getting credit for the victory. St. Louis went on to take the series in seven games.

Craig was well known as an original 1962 New York Met. As a member of the starting rotation of the 1962 and  Mets, who lost 120 and 111 games, respectively, Craig posted a nightmarish 15–46 won–lost record during his two seasons with the expansion team. "But," Craig once recalled, "11 of those times it took a shutout to  beat me." Despite his poor record, Craig was a stalwart of the legendarily bad team's pitching staff.  Remarkably, he threw 27 complete games in 64 starts, demonstrating that he was one of the Mets' best pitchers. His manager, Casey Stengel, told him, "You've gotta be good to lose that many."

He lost the first game in Mets' history, 11–4, in St. Louis.  (It has been erroneously believed that he gave up the Mets' first run on a balk; although he did commit a balk in the first inning, he already trailed 1–0, and the balk was not a scoring play.) Then, in 1963, Craig suffered through a personal 18-game losing streak, and changed his uniform number from his traditional 38 to "unlucky" 13 to break the 90-day winless skein, which lasted from May 4 through August 4. He finally broke the drought with a complete game, 7–3 win over the Chicago Cubs at the Polo Grounds on August 9—a game the Mets won in the ninth inning on a walk-off grand-slam home run by Jim Hickman. The victory improved Craig's record to 3–20. 

A master of the split-finger fastball, Craig worked in 368 games over the course of his 12-year MLB career. In 1,536 career innings pitched, he surrendered 1,528 hits and 522 bases on balls, with 803 strikeouts and a 3.83 earned run average. He threw seven shutouts and 58 complete games, and earned 19 saves. His late MLB tenure consisted of one-year stops with the Cardinals, Cincinnati Reds and Philadelphia Phillies. Although he performed poorly during the 1959 World Series, Craig helped pitch the 1959 Los Angeles Dodgers to the National League pennant, winning 11 games (with complete-game victories in his last three starts), posting a brilliant 2.06 ERA, and leading his league in shutouts (four), despite making only 17 starts and spending part of the season with the Triple-A Spokane Indians. Overall he appeared in four World Series; in seven games and 26 innings pitched, he allowed 19 earned runs on 31 hits and 16 bases on balls, and struck out 25. He split four World Series decisions and compiled a 6.49 ERA.

Coach and manager
Craig retired from the mound after the 1966 campaign and rejoined the Dodgers as a scout (1967) and manager of Double-A Albuquerque (1968). In , former Dodger general manager Buzzie Bavasi appointed Craig the first pitching coach in the history of the newly born San Diego Padres. Enduring the growing pains of another expansion team, Craig spent four years as the Padres' mound tutor before he was replaced by ex-teammate Podres. After another brief return to the Dodgers as a minor league pitching instructor in 1973, Craig resumed his MLB coaching career with the Houston Astros (–) and had a second tour with the Padres (–). During the latter year, the Padres lost 93 games under two managers, John McNamara and Alvin Dark.

In March 1978—in the midst of spring training, and only two weeks before Opening Day—the Padres' ownership fired Dark for "miscommunication" with his players and elevated Craig to the manager's post. Said Craig at the time: "It was the shock of my life, but the best shock I've ever had. My main task now is to get the players to relax so they can perform to the best of their capabilities." The 1978 Padres responded to Craig's leadership, improving by 15 games over 1977 and posting the first winning season (84–78) in franchise history. However, Craig's 1979 team took a giant step backward, reverting to a poor 68–93 record. Craig was fired at season's end and replaced by Jerry Coleman, the former Yankee second baseman then serving as the radio voice of the Padres.

The firing eventually proved to be beneficial to Craig's managing career, however. The 1984 Tigers stormed to a 35–5 start, the American League pennant, and World Series championship (achieved against the San Diego Padres). The national exposure he received burnished Craig's reputation as one of baseball's top pitching coaches and teacher of the split-finger fastball. But when the Detroit front office refused his request for a salary increase for 1985, Craig retired to his San Diego County ranch. His retirement did not last a full baseball season.

San Francisco Giants
From September 18, 1985, through the end of 1992, Craig was the manager of the San Francisco Giants. He replaced Jim Davenport for the final 18 games of the 1985 season, posting a 6–12 record. But in his first five full seasons with the Giants, 1986 through 1990, they never finished with a losing record.

In 1987, Craig's Giants belted 205 home runs, second-most in the circuit, and won 90 games and the National League Western Division title, to make their first appearance in the postseason since . The Giants' divisional title in 1987 came just two years after they lost 100 games. The club came within one game of going to the World Series that year, losing to the Cardinals in seven games. Reportedly, Craig assigned players to watch the third base coach, a runner on base, and the man at the plate for each game, with the pitcher being told to do pick off attempts to help with studying what was seen. Along the way, Craig brought new popularity to the old baseball term "Humm Baby" — traditional baseball chatter that urges pitchers to put extra "mustard" on their fastballs. Brad Gulden, the third-string catcher behind Bob Brenly and Bob Melvin on the 1986 team, was the original “Humm Baby”. The moniker was bestowed on Gulden by Craig, and in the late 1980s the term spread until it applied to the entire team.

In 1989, Craig's Giants won their first National League pennant since 1962. Led by sluggers Kevin Mitchell and Will Clark and starting pitcher Rick Reuschel, they won 92 regular-season games (their most since ) and took the NL West title by three games over the Padres. Then they defeated the Cubs in five games in the 1989 National League Championship Series. But Craig's Giants were swept in four games by the Oakland Athletics in the World Series.  That Series, the first ever between San Francisco Bay Area teams, was marred by the 1989 Loma Prieta earthquake, which struck October 17, minutes before Game 3, scheduled for Candlestick Park. The quake killed 63 people and caused over 3,750 casualties. It delayed the World Series for ten days.

But, in an eventful offseason, the National League rejected the Lurie-Naimoli deal; it instead approved the Giants' sale to a San Francisco group, headed by Peter Magowan, committed to keeping the club in the Bay Area. The new owners dismissed Craig on December 2. He finished with a career managerial record of 738 wins and 737 losses, 586–566 (.509) with the Giants. Then Magowan's group signed superstar free agent Barry Bonds on December 8. With Bonds anchoring his lineup, Craig's successor, Dusty Baker, won 103 games in 1993 and was named National League Manager of the Year.

Managerial record

References

Further reading

External links

Roger Craig at SABR (Baseball BioProject)
YouTube video of Craig's start against the St. Louis Cardinals, July 25, 1959
Roger Craig at Baseball Almanac
Roger Craig at Baseballbiography.com
Roger Craig at Ultimate Mets Database
The original Humm-baby Article on the 20th Anniversary of the phrase "Humm Baby"
Giants Clubhouse: Humm Baby

   
   
   

1930 births
Living people
Albuquerque Dodgers players
Baseball coaches from North Carolina
Baseball managers
Baseball players from North Carolina
Brooklyn Dodgers players
Cincinnati Reds players
Detroit Tigers coaches
Elmira Pioneers players
Houston Astros coaches
Los Angeles Dodgers players
Los Angeles Dodgers scouts
Major League Baseball pitchers
Major League Baseball pitching coaches
Minor league baseball managers
Montreal Royals players
NC State Wolfpack baseball players
New York Mets players
Newport News Dodgers players
Philadelphia Phillies players
Pueblo Dodgers players
St. Louis Cardinals players
St. Paul Saints (AA) players
San Diego Padres coaches
San Diego Padres managers
San Francisco Giants managers
Seattle Angels players
Spokane Indians players
Sportspeople from Durham, North Carolina
Valdosta Dodgers players
NC State Wolfpack men's basketball players
American military personnel of the Korean War